Franz Dorfmüller (17 April 1887 in Regensburg – 8 July 1974 in Munich at age 87) was a German pianist, piano teacher and music writer. In addition to guest performances and lectures, he was active at the main venues of Munich, Regensburg, Philadelphia (Pennsylvania) and Nuremberg.

Well-known pupils of Dorfmüller were Hermann Reutter, Günter Wand and Karl Holl.

Publications 
 Kurt Dorfmüller: Zum Münchner Musikleben während des ersten Weltkrieges und der Nachkriegsjahre; Beitrag in 100 Jahre Münchner Philharmoniker, ed. by Gabriele E. Meyer. Munich 1994.
 Kurt Dorfmüller: Die Münchner Musikszene: Von den zwanziger Jahren in die NS-Zeit in "Zur Situation der Musik in Deutschland in den dreissiger und vierziger Jahren". Publisher Orff-Zentrum München.
 Anton Kerschensteiner, Ernst Wengenmayer, Oskar Kaul, Franz Dorfmüller, Albert Hartmann, Otto Loesch: Geschichte des Akademischen Gesangvereins München 1861–1961, Munich 1961.

References

External links 
 Dorfmüller, Franz on 
 Gabriele E. Meyer: Neue Musik-Wochen in München, 1929–1931 Gründung der „Vereinigung für zeitgenössische Musik“ In BLO (Historisches Lexikon Bayerns)
 

German classical pianists
Male classical pianists
20th-century classical pianists
Academic staff of the University of Music and Performing Arts Munich
1887 births
1974 deaths
Musicians from Regensburg
20th-century German male pianists